The 1972–73 season was Manchester City's 71st season of competitive football and 53rd season in the top division of English football. In addition to the First Division, the club competed in the FA Cup, Football League Cup, FA Charity Shield and the UEFA Cup.

First Division

League table

Results summary

References

External links

Manchester City F.C. seasons
Manchester City